Reed's Candy was a range of candies manufactured by The Reed's Candy Company in Chicago.

History

Reed's candy was produced in the United States for over 100 years. The Reed's Candy Company is an American producer of confectionery, which was started by William and Eugene Reed of Chicago. Together with their father, they founded the company in 1893 for the production and sale of butterscotch candies.

They expanded the candy line with their top selling product, the hard candy roll. The cooking process consisted of using copper kettles to boil butter, corn syrup and other ingredients to create an individually hard finished candy. Machinery was custom made to allow the product to go from the cooking phase directly into packaging. The pieces were packaged eight to a roll, with a cellophane button-wrapper to protect freshness.

By 1921, the firm had become the largest manufacturer of butterscotch candy in the United States. Other flavors included peppermint, root beer, licorice, cinnamon, spearmint, butter rum, and teaberry. Lorillard Tobacco Company purchased Reed's Candy in 1962, and operated it as a subsidiary. When Lorillard was bought by Loews Cineplex Entertainment several years later, Reed's Candy became a subsidiary of Loews. In February 1972, Loews Corporation decided to concentrate only in the entertainment industry, and sold Reed's to HP Hood. Reed's acquired D. L. Clark Company in 1973.

HP Hood divested Reed's in 1981, which filed for bankruptcy the next year and shut down. Production resumed in 1983, when the company was purchased by its former president and chairman. In the 1980s, Reed's had gum production outsourced in a co-packing arrangement with Amurol Products, a subsidiary of Wrigley Gum. Amurol bought Reed's (but not Clark) in 1989, and they discontinued production in 2006.

Current
Iconic Candy Company of New York, a successor in interest of Reed Candy Company of Chicago, IL, is currently producing four original Reed's candy rolls in butterscotch, root beer, cinnamon, and peppermint flavors. It also produces 4 oz bags of individually wrapped hard candies in cinnamon, butterscotch, and root beer flavors.

References

Confectionery companies of the United States